Perils of the Jungle is a 1953 American black and white adventure film directed by George Blair, featuring animal trainer and circus impresario Clyde Beatty and Phyllis Coates, known for her roles in serials and "B" films. Perennial "heavy" John Doucette also appeared in the film.

Plot
In order to save them from extinction, explorer Grantland Cunningham (Stanley Ferrar) engages animal trainer Clyde Beatty to accompany him to Africa to capture a few of the last known Nubian lions. The pair run afoul of hunters led by Gorman (John Doucette) who wish to kill rather than capture the big cats. Beatty and Cunningham are aided in their quest by humanitarian Jo Carter (Phyllis Coates).

Gorman is nearly killed by a gorilla and when Clyde saves him, he offers to help find lions. The expedition to Southern Rhodesia takes the two men into dangerous tribal areas. After a series of dangerous encounters, both Clyde and Grant make it back to safety, vowing to set out on more adventures in the future.

Cast 
 Clyde Beatty as Clyde Beatty
 Phyllis Coates as Jo Carter
 John Doucette as Gorman
 Leonard Mudie as Grubbs
 Roy Glenn as Korjah
 Olaf Hytten as Mac
 Stanley Farrar as Grantland Cunningham
 Joel Fluellen as Kenny
 Tudor Owen as Commissioner
 Shelby Bacon as Boy King

Production
Perils of the Jungle was first released March 3, 1953. In 2006, the film was released by St Clair Vision as part of a 3-disk compilation titled, King of Kong Island and Other Ape Flicks and in 2009, by Alpha Video as a single.

Reception
Hal Erickson of Rovi noted that the film "looks suspiciously like two half-hour TV pilots strung together."

References

External links 

1953 films
American adventure drama films
1950s adventure drama films
American black-and-white films
Films directed by George Blair
Lippert Pictures films
1953 drama films
1950s English-language films
1950s American films